The 2018 UNCAF U-19 Tournament is a football competition scheduled to take place in August 2018.

It is to prepare teams for the 2018 CONCACAF U-20 Championship.

Venues

Standings

Matches

References

2018
2018 in youth association football
2018